Tim Kruse (born 10 January 1983) is a German football coach and a former player who played as a defensive midfielder. He is the assistant manager of FC Energie Cottbus.

Career
Kruse made his debut on the professional league level in the 2. Bundesliga for Rot-Weiß Oberhausen on 17 August 2008 when he started in a game against TuS Koblenz.

Kruse retired at the end of the 2018–19 season. In January 2020, he was hired as assistant coach of Sebastian Abt at his former club, FC Energie Cottbus.

Career statistics

References

1983 births
Living people
People from Mayen
Association football midfielders
German footballers
Footballers from Rhineland-Palatinate
Fortuna Düsseldorf players
Rot-Weiß Oberhausen players
Bayer 04 Leverkusen II players
1. FC Saarbrücken players
Hallescher FC players
FC Energie Cottbus players
2. Bundesliga players
3. Liga players
Regionalliga players
German football managers
FC Energie Cottbus managers